Persatuan Sepakbola Peureulak Raya (simply known as PS Peureulak Raya) is an Indonesian football club based in Peureulak District, East Aceh Regency, Aceh. They currently compete in the Liga 3.

References

External links

Football clubs in Indonesia
Football clubs in Aceh